Tzrufa is a moshav in northern Israel. Located near Atlit, it falls under the jurisdiction of Hof HaCarmel Regional Council.

History
The village was established in 1949 by immigrants from Algeria and Tunisia. The village was named after  the depopulated Palestinian village of al-Sarafand on whose lands it was built. There is an inscription at the village entrance which states ""The word of the Lord is pure [tzrufa]; He is a shield to all them that take refuge in him" (Psalms 18:30)," but this is not the origin of the village's name. During the Crusader period, the village was known as Sarepta Yudee, possibly to distinguish it from Sarepta of Lebanon. Both names means "smelting place." Roman and Byzantine pottery remains have been found on site. During the Crusader era, a fortress and chapel were built. The remains of the village mosque can still be seen.

References

Moshavim
Populated places established in 1949
Populated places in Haifa District
1949 establishments in Israel
Algerian-Jewish culture in Israel
Tunisian-Jewish culture in Israel